The Sho Dun Festival, commonly known as the Shoton or Yogurt Festival or Banquet since "Sho" means Yogurt and "Dun" means Banquet, is an annual festival held at Norbulingka or "Jewel Park" palace in Lhasa, Tibet Autonomous Region.

The festival is celebrated in the summer, from the 15th to the 24th of the 5th lunar month - usually about the middle of August, after a month's retreat by the monks who stay within their monasteries to avoid walking on the emerging summer insects and killing them.

It began in the 11th century with a banquet given by the laypeople for the monks featuring yogurt. Later on, summer operas, or Lhamo, and theatricals were added to the festivities. The operas, "last all day with clashing cymbals, bells and drums; piercing recitatives punctuating more melodious choruses; hooded villains, leaping devils, swirling girls with long silk sleeves. In the past dancers came from all over Tibet, but today there is only the state-run Lhasa Singing and Dancing Troupe."

The beautiful grounds of the Norbulingka are filled with partying groups shielded from the wind by gaily coloured hanging walls of rugs and printed canvas. There is much feasting and visiting between family groups and bonfires are common at night.

References

External links
Festivals & Events in China
Shoton Festival Photo Gallery in Tibet 
Photos: Buddha painting unfolding ceremony in Tibet

Annual events in China
Culture of Lhasa
Events in Lhasa
Tibetan festivals
August events
Food and drink festivals in Tibet
Religious festivals in Tibet
Summer events in China